is a Japanese figure skater. He is the 2022 Four Continents silver medalist and a four-time Grand Prix medalist. He has represented Japan at two World Championships, achieving his best placement, fifth, at the 2018 World Championships. He is also the 2016–17 Japan Junior national champion.

Personal life 
Tomono was born May 15, 1998, in Osaka. His figure skating idols are Tatsuki Machida and Daisuke Takahashi.

In March 2021, Tomono graduated from Doshisha University's Sports Science department.

Career

Early years 
Tomono began learning to skate in 2006.

In August 2011, he placed 7th at the 2011 CS Asian Trophy in the junior men's competition. In November 2011, he placed 9th at the 2012 Japan Junior Championships.

In November 2012, he placed 10th at the 2013 Japan Junior Championships.

During the 2013–14 season, Tomono competed at the 2014 Japan Championships at both the junior and senior men's competition. He placed 6th in the junior men's competition and 20th in the senior men's competition. In March 2014, he won the silver medal at 2014 International Challenge Cup in the junior men's competition.

In the 2014–15 season, Tomono competed at both the junior and senior men's competition at the 2015 Japan Championships. He placed 4th in the junior men's competition and 18th in the senior men's competition. In March 2015, he won the silver medal at the 2015 Coupe Du Printemps in the junior men's competition.

2015–2016 season: Junior Grand Prix debut

Tomono debuted on the ISU Junior Grand Prix (JGP) series in August 2015, placing 13th in Riga, Latvia. He won the silver medal at the 2015–16 Japan Junior Championships and placed 16th at the senior men's competition. He was brought in to compete at the 2016 World Junior Championships in Debrecen, Hungary, as a late alternate after Sota Yamamoto withdrew. He qualified for the free skate in Hungary by placing 20th in the short program. His 12th place in the free skate lifted him to 15th overall.

2016–2017 season: National junior title
Competing in the 2016–17 JGP series, Tomono placed fourth in Yokohama, Japan, and won the bronze medal in Ljubljana, Slovenia. He won the national junior title in November 2016 and placed fifth on the senior level at the Japan Championships in December 2016. He qualified for the free skate at the 2017 World Junior Championships in Taipei, Taiwan and placed 9th overall, 14th in the short program and 7th in the free skate.

2017–2018 season: Worlds debut

Tomono began his season with a fifth-place finish at the 2017 U.S. Figure Skating Classic. In November, he replaced Daisuke Murakami at the 2017 NHK Trophy and finished 7th. 
After placing fifth in both segments, he placed fourth overall at the 2018 Japan Championships.
At the 2018 Coupe du Printemps, he won the silver medal at the senior men's competition.

He was selected to compete at the 2018 Worlds in Milan, Italy, after the withdrawal of Yuzuru Hanyu. He finished eleventh in the short program, third in the free skate, and fifth overall, setting new personal bests in all segments of the competition. His breakout performances and result helped Team Japan secure three berths for the 2019 World Figure Skating Championships.

2018–2019 season 

Tomono began his season with a fifth-place finish at 2018 CS Lombardia Trophy. In October, he placed 9th overall with a score of 220.83 at his first GP event 2018 Skate Canada International. In November, at 2018 Rostelecom Cup, he placed third overall with a personal best score of 238.73.

At the 2019 Japan Championships, he placed fourth overall, seventh in the short program, and third in the free skate.  With Yuzuru Hanyu unready to compete and silver medalist Daisuke Takahashi declining international assignments, Tomono was sent to the 2019 Four Continents Championships, where he finished twelfth.

2019–2020 season 

Tomono placed seventh at the 2019 CS Lombardia Trophy to begin the season before placing fifth at the 2019 Skate America and eighth at the 2019 Rostelecom Cup.

At the 2020 Japan Championships, he placed sixth overall after placing eleventh in the short program and fourth in the free skate.  With gold medalist Shoma Uno declining the invitation, Tomono was sent to the 2020 Four Continents Championships, where he finished seventh, setting new personal bests in all segments of the competition.

2020–2021 season 
Competing domestically, Tomono won the silver medal at the Western Sectionals championship, qualifying for a berth at the national championships. With the COVID-19 pandemic affecting international travel, the Grand Prix was assigned primarily based on geographic location, and Tomono competed at the 2020 NHK Trophy in an all-Japanese men's field.  He placed second in the short program, 3.99 points behind Yuma Kagiyama.  In the free skate, he doubled a quad attempt and turned out of another, among other jump errors, remaining in second place overall to take the silver medal, albeit nearly 50 points behind gold medalist Kagiyama's score. He assessed his errors as resulting from being "too careful."

Tomono placed sixth at the 2020–21 Japan Championships.

2021–2022 season: Four Continents silver 
Tomono's first Grand Prix assignment was initially the 2021 Cup of China, but following its cancellation, he was reassigned to the 2021 Gran Premio d'Italia in Turin. He placed sixth at the event. At his second assignment, the 2021 Rostelecom Cup, he placed first in the short program and fifth in the free to finish third overall, setting new personal bests in all segments of the competition. This was the third Grand Prix medal of his career.

At the 2021–22 Japan Championships, Tomono finished in fifth place. He was named as second alternate for the Japanese Olympic team and sent to compete at the 2022 Four Continents Championships. Tomono finished second at Four Continents, setting new personal bests in all segments of the competition. Following injury-related withdrawals by national champion Yuzuru Hanyu and first alternate Kao Miura, Tomono was named to the Japanese team for the 2022 World Championships. As a result of the International Skating Union banning all Russian athletes due to their country's invasion of Ukraine and the absences of Hanyu and Nathan Chen due to injury, the World Championships men's field was considered more open than usual. A clean skate in the short program earned Tomono a new personal best and a small bronze medal for third place, sweeping the segment alongside fellow Japanese skaters Shoma Uno and Yuma Kagiyama. In the free skate, Tomono made a number of errors, dropping to sixth place overall. Speaking afterwards, Tomono expressed gratitude for "this wonderful opportunity to skate at the end of the season" while also noting that he had "regrets that I couldn't put on my best in this performance. I didn't really feel pressured, it was more the lack of practice, and I realized that I am not yet ready to be on the podium, so I need to practice harder."

2022–2023 season 
In his first event of the season, Tomono came fourth at the 2022 CS Nebelhorn Trophy, including a third-place finish in the free skate. He placed second in the short program at the 2022 Grand Prix de France, the first of his two Grand Prix assignments, but dropped to third overall after the free skate and earned the bronze medal. He admitted to "some regrets to my performance" in the free, vowing to improve his mental consistency while under pressure to win. He praised the French audience at the event. After missing his quad Salchow in the short program at the 2022 NHK Trophy, he placed fourth in that segment. Despite being third in the free skate, he remained in fourth place overall, 2.93 points behind bronze medalist Cha Jun-hwan.

Tomono was fourth in both segments at the 2022–23 Japan Championships, but placed third overall, winning the bronze medal and standing on the senior national podium for the first time in his career. He was named to compete at the 2023 World Championships.

Programs

Competitive highlights
GP: Grand Prix; CS: Challenger Series; JGP: Junior Grand Prix

2017–18 season to present

Earlier career

Detailed results
Small medals for short and free programs are awarded only at ISU Championships.
Current personal best scores are highlighted in bold. Historical personal best scores highlighted in bold.

Junior level

References

External links 

 
 Kazuki Tomono: Central Sports athlete

1998 births
Japanese male single skaters
Living people
People from Sakai, Osaka
Competitors at the 2019 Winter Universiade